Nebria uenoiana is a species of ground beetle in the Nebriinae subfamily that can be found in China and Taiwan.

References

uenoiana
Beetles described in 1972
Beetles of Asia